Philippe Dubuisson-Lebon (born June 19, 1988) is a Canadian professional Canadian football linebacker who is currently a free agent. He played CIS football at the Université de Sherbrooke. He has been a member of the Hamilton Tiger-Cats, Winnipeg Blue Bombers and Ottawa Redblacks.

Professional career

Hamilton Tiger-Cats
Dubuisson-Lebon was signed by the Hamilton Tiger-Cats on October 23, 2012. He was released by the Tiger-Cats on October 31, 2012. He was signed by the Tiger-Cats on April 4, 2013. Dubuisson-Lebon was released by the Tiger-Cats on July 2, 2013. He appeared in one game for the Tiger-Cats.

Winnipeg Blue Bombers
Dubuisson-Lebon signed with the Winnipeg Blue Bombers on July 16, 2013. He appeared in six games for the Blue Bombers.

Ottawa Redblacks
Dubuisson-Lebon was signed by the Ottawa Redblacks on August 26, 2014. He was released by the Redblacks on May 14, 2015.

References

External links
Just Sports Stats
Ottawa Redblacks profile

Living people
1988 births
Players of Canadian football from Quebec
Canadian football linebackers
Sherbrooke Vert et Or football players
Hamilton Tiger-Cats players
Winnipeg Blue Bombers players
Canadian football people from Montreal